Bidestan is a city in Alborz Province, Iran.

Bidestan or Bidastan may also refer to:
 Bidestan, Firuzabad, Fars Province
 Bidestan, Kerman
 Bidestan, Khuzestan
 Bidastan, Kohgiluyeh and Boyer-Ahmad
 Bidastan-e Murderaz, Kohgiluyeh and Boyer-Ahmad Province
 Bidestan, Lorestan
 Bidestan, Torbat-e Heydarieh, Razavi Khorasan Province
 Bidestan, Torbat-e Jam, Razavi Khorasan Province
 Bidestan, Semnan
 Bidestan, South Khorasan
 Bidestan, Yazd